Polystichopsis is a genus of ferns in the family Dryopteridaceae, subfamily Polybotryoideae, in the Pteridophyte Phylogeny Group classification of 2016 (PPG I).

Species
, the Checklist of Ferns and Lycophytes of the World accepted the following species:

Polystichopsis chaerophylloides (Poir.) C.V.Morton
Polystichopsis leucochaete (Sloss.) J.Prado & R.C.Moran
Polystichopsis lurida (Jenman ex Underw. & Maxon) C.V.Morton
Polystichopsis muscosa (M.Vahl) Proctor
Polystichopsis puberula J.Prado & R.C.Moran
Polystichopsis pubescens (L.) C.V.Morton
Polystichopsis × sanchezii J.Prado & R.C.Moran
Polystichopsis sericea (Mett. ex Eaton) C.Sánchez

References

Dryopteridaceae
Fern genera